Honey Grove, sometimes spelled as Honeygrove, is an unincorporated community in Christian County, Kentucky, United States. Kentucky Route 508 runs through the community. Honey Grove has a single firehouse that is staffed by volunteer personnel.

The McClellen House is located in Honey Grove, and was listed on the U.S. National Register of Historic Places in 1979.

References

Further reading
 

Unincorporated communities in Christian County, Kentucky
Unincorporated communities in Kentucky